Jason is a common masculine given name.

The name was borne in Greek mythology by Jason, the great Thessalian hero who led the Argonauts in the quest for the Golden Fleece. The name is also found in the New Testament, as the house of a man named Jason was used as a refuge by Paul and Silas. In his case, it could come as a Hellenized form of Joshua.

Its adoption in the United Kingdom peaked during the 1970s, when it was among the top 20 male names, but it had fallen out of the top 100 by 2003.

Jason is the most common spelling; however, there are many variant spellings such as Jaeson, Jaison, Jayson, and Jacyn. Jay and Jace are the common diminutives.

A feminine name that sounds similar is Jacin, derived from the Portuguese-Spanish name Jacinta or the Anglicized version Jacinda, meaning hyacinth.

Notable people with the name

Historical figures
Jason, mythological leader of the Argonauts
Jason (high priest) (2nd century BCE), High Priest of Jerusalem
Jason the Martyr (3rd century), saint and martyr
Jason of Cyrene (circa 100 BCE), Jewish historian
Jason of Nysa (circa 100 BCE), Stoic philosopher
Jason of Pherae (died 370 BCE), King of Thessaly
Jason of Tarsus, saint numbered among the 72 Apostles
Jason of Tralles (1st century BCE), tragic actor singing the Bacchae of Euripides when the head of Crassus was brought to the king Orodes II

Born 1400–1900
Giasone del Maino (1435–1519), Italian jurist
Jason W. Briggs (1821–1899), American leader of the Latter Day Saint movement
Jason B. Parrish (1878–1906), American football player and coach
Jason Chamberlaine (born 1821), gold miner in California
Jay Cooke (1821–1905), American financier
Jason Downer (1813–1883), American judge in Wisconsin
Jason E. Hammond (1862–1957), American educator and politician
Jason Fairbanks (1780–1801), American murderer
Jay Gould (1836–1892), American railroad magnate
Jason Haven (1733–1803), American minister
Jason John Nassau (1893–1965) American Astronomer
Jason Lee (missionary) (1803–1845), Canadian missionary
Jason Niles (1814–1894), American lawyer, newspaper editor, and politician
Jason Pratensis (1486–1558), Dutch neurologist and poet
Jason Ralph (footballer) (1872–1952), Australian rules footballer
Jason Russell (1716–1775), American whose home was the site of a battle in the American Revolutionary War
Jason Smogorzewski (1717–1779), Bishop of Ruthenia

Born after 1900
Jason (Spanish footballer) (born 1994), Spanish football player
Jason Abalos (born 1985), Filipino actor
Jason Akermanis (born 1977), Australian rules footballer
Jason Aldean (born 1977), American country singer
Jason Alexander (disambiguation), multiple people
Jason Ankrah (born 1991), American football player
Jason Bateman (born 1969), American television and film actor
Jason Beaulieu (born 1994), Canadian soccer player
Jason Benjamin (1971–2021), Australian artist
Jason Berger (1924-2010), American painter 
Jason Bergmann (born 1981), American baseball player
Jason Bernard (1938-1996), American actor 
Jason Biggs (born 1978), American actor
Jason L Blair, American writer and game designer
Jason Boe (1929-1990) 
Jason Bohn (born 1973), American golfer
Jason Bonham (born 1966), English drummer, son of Led Zeppelin drummer John Bonham
Jason Brown (disambiguation), multiple people
Jason Cabinda (born 1996), American football player
Jason Castro (born 1987), American baseball player
Jason Castro (born 1987), American singer and musician
Jason Chan, Hong Kong singer
Jason Chorak (born 1974), American football player
Jason Christopher (born 1971), American musician
Jason Clark (disambiguation), multiple people
Jason Clarke (born 1969), Australian actor
 Jason Clarke (writer) (born 1978), American writer and web developer
Jason Collier (1977–2005), American basketball player
Jason Connery (born 1963), English actor 
Jason Crowe (born 1978), English footballer
Jason Crowe (basketball) (born 1976), American basketball player
Jason Crumb (born 1973), Canadian football player
Jason Cundy (born 1969), English association footballer and broadcaster
Jason Danino-Holt (born 1987), Israeli actor and TV presenter
Jason Dawe (ice hockey) (born 1973), Canadian ice hockey player
Jason Dawe (presenter) (born 1967), English journalist and TV presenter
Jason Daly, Westmeath Gaelic footballer
Jason Day (disambiguation), multiple people
Jason Demers (born 1988), Canadian ice hockey player
Jason Derulo (born 1989), American singer
Jason Donovan (born 1968), Australian actor and singer
Jason Drucker (born 2005), American child actor
Jason Dunstall (born 1964), Australian rules footballer
Jason Earles (born 1977), American actor and comedian
Jason Ellis (disambiguation), multiple people
Jason Ellsworth, American politician
Jason Epstein (born 1928) American editor 
Jason Farradane (1906–1989), British librarian and pioneer in Information science
Jason Forbes (born 1990), British actor, writer, comedian, impressionist, and TV presenter
Jason David Frank (1973–2022), American actor and MMA fighter
Jason Garrett (born 1966), American football coach and player
Jason Geria (born 1993), Australian football player
Jason Giambi (born 1971), American professional baseball player
Jason Gilkison, Australian choreographer and dancer
Jason Griffith (born 1980), American actor and voice actor
Jason "Jace" Hall (born 1971), American film, television, and video game producer
Jason Holder (born 1991), Barbados and West Indies cricketer
Jason Holt (born 1993), Scottish footballer
Jason Holt (businessman) (born 1969), British businessman
Jason Hughes (disambiguation), multiple people
Jason Huntley (born 1998), American football player
Jason Todd Ipson (born 1972), American director, screenwriter, producer, fashion photographer and surgeon
Jason Isaacs (born 1963), English actor
Jason Kander (born 1981), American politician
Jason Kapono (born 1981), American basketball player
Jason Kelce (born 1987), American football player
Jason Keng-Kwin Chan (born 1971), Malaysian-Australian actor
Jason Kennedy (footballer) (born 1986), English association football player
Jason Kennedy (TV personality) (born 1981), American television personality
Jason Kidd (born 1973), American basketball player and coach
Jason Killeen (born 1985), Irish basketball player
Jason King (disambiguation), multiple people
Jason Knight (disambiguation), multiple people
Jason Kouchak, French musician and composer
Jason Kralt (born 1974), Canadian football player
Jason Lai (born 1974), British orchestral conductor
Jason Lamar (born 1978), American football player
Jason Lee (disambiguation), multiple people
Jason Leonard (born 1968), England international rugby union player
Jason Lewis (disambiguation), multiple people
Jason London (born 1972), American actor
Jason Lowndes (1994–2017), Australian cyclist
Jason Lytle (born 1969), American musician
Jason Maguire (born 1980), Irish horse racing jockey
Jason Manuel Olazabal (born 1973), American actor
Jason Marsden (born 1975), American actor
Jason Martin-Smith (1972–2001), English murder victim
Jason Marquis (born 1978), American baseball player
Jason Matheson (born 1974), American television and radio host
Jason McCartney (disambiguation), multiple people
Jason Mewes (born 1974), American actor
Jason Molins (born 1974), Irish cricketer
Jason Momoa (born 1979), American actor
Jason Moore (disambiguation), multiple people
Jason Mraz (born 1977), American singer-songwriter
Jason Nash (born 1973), American actor, writer, director, comedian, podcaster, YouTuber and Viner
Jason Nemes (born 1978), American politician
Jason Newsted (born 1963), American bass player, member of the band Metallica
Jason Orange (born 1970), English musician, member of the band Take That
Jason Pearce (born 1987), English footballer
Jason Pinnock (born 1999), American football player
Jason Priestley (born 1969), Canadian television and film actor
Jason Reynolds, American novelist
Jason Richardson (disambiguation), multiple people
Jason Ritter (born 1980), American actor, son of actor John Ritter
Jason Robards Sr. (1892–1963), American stage and film actor
Jason Robards (1922–2000), American actor
Jason Roy (born 1990), English cricket player
Jason Sanders (born 1995), American football player
Jason Sangha, Australian-Indian cricket player
Jason Scheff (born 1962), American musician, member of the band Chicago
Jason Schmidt (born 1973), American baseball player
Jason Schmidt (photographer) (born 1969), American photographer
Jason Schwartzman (born 1980), American actor and musician
Jason Scott (born 1970), American archivist and historian of technology
 Jason Scott (rower) (born 1970), American Olympic rower
Jason Scott Lee (born 1966), Asian-American actor
Jason Segel (born 1980), American television actor
Jason Sherlock (born 1976), Dublin Gaelic footballer
Jason Siggers (born 1985), American basketball player in the Israel Basketball Premier League
Jason Smith (disambiguation), multiple people
Jason Spencer (born 1974), American politician and physician assistant
Jason Spezza (born 1983), Canadian ice hockey player
Jason Statham (born 1967), English actor
Jason Strowbridge (born 1996), American football player
Jason Stuart (born 1969), American actor and comedian
Jason Sudeikis (born 1975), American actor and comedian
Jason Richard Swallen (1903–1991), American botanist 
Jason Terry (born 1977), American basketball player
Jason Vargas (born 1983), American baseball pitcher
Jason Varitek (born 1972), American baseball catcher
Jason Verduzco (born 1970), American football player
Jason Wade (born 1980), American musician, member of the band Lifehouse
Jason Watkins (disambiguation), multiple people
 Jason Watson (footballer) (born 1991), Jamaican footballer
 Jason Watson (jockey) (born 2000s), English jockey
Jason Westrol (born 1988), American basketball player
Jason Whitaker (born 1977), American football player
Jason White (disambiguation), multiple people
Jason Williams (basketball, born 1975) (born 1975), American NBA basketball player
Jason Williams (basketball, born 1983) (born 1983), American international basketball player
Jason Wingreen (1920–2015), American actor
Jason Winston George (born 1972), American actor
Jason Wright (born 1982), American football player, businessman, and executive
Jason F. Wright (born 1971), American author and speaker
Jason Young (born 1980), Thai actor and singer
Jason Yuan (born 1942), Taiwanese politician and diplomat
Jason Zimmerman (born 1989), American professional Super Smash Bros. player, known as 'Mew2King'
Jason Zucker (born 1992), American ice hockey player

Animals
 Jason, a cat on the BBC series Blue Peter

Fictional characters
 Jason, portrayed by Kurt Dykhuizen in Barney & Friends
 Jason, portrayed by Salim Grant in Barney and the Backyard Gang
 Jason, an antagonist in the animated series Craig of the Creek
 Jason, a child in the Broadway show, Falsettos
 Jason, the protagonist of the cartoon web-series An Egg's Guide to Minecraft and supporting character in The Crack!.
 Jason, Wonder Woman's evil twin brother in the DC Rebirth era
 Jason the Bodyguard, played by Nathaniel Martin Thomas in the web-series Corner Shop Show
 Jason Blood, aka Etrigan, a DC Comics character
 Jason Bourne, protagonist of Robert Ludlum's novels and their film adaptations
 Jason Carver, an antagonist from Stranger Things
 Jason Costello, a character in Hollyoaks
 Jason Cross, from High School Musical
 Jason "J.D." Dean, the main antagonist in the 1988 film Heathers
 Jason Evans, a character in the 2004 disaster film The Day After Tomorrow
 Jason Fox, from the comic strip FoxTrot
 Jason "Jay" Garrick, the first Flash from DC Comics
 Jason Grace, a son of Jupiter and one of the main characters in Rick Riordan's The Heroes of Olympus novels
 Jason Grimshaw, from the soap opera Coronation Street
 Jason Hogart, from Degrassi: The Next Generation
 Jason Pembroke, a character in the American sitcom Charles in Charge
 Jason Lee Scott, the first Red Ranger and later the Golden Ranger in the Power Rangers franchise
 Jason Morgan from General Hospital
 Jason Rusch, the second Firestorm from DC Comics
 Jason Stackhouse, in The Southern Vampire Mysteries series by Charlaine Harris
 Jason Stentley (known better by nickname C.J. for "Captain Jason"), a police captain in the show Brooklyn Nine-Nine
 Jason Street, on the TV series Friday Night Lights
 Jason Todd, the second Robin in Batman comics, later revived as Red Hood
 Jason Voorhees, antagonist of the Friday the 13th franchise
 Jason White (disambiguation), several people, including fictional characters

References

English-language masculine given names
English masculine given names
Given names
Given names of Greek language origin
Masculine given names